Foreclosure stripping is the process in which the owners of a foreclosed property will remove fixtures and fittings from the property in an attempt to salvage some of their investment. Malicious foreclosure stripping is done by home owners who render damage throughout the property to significantly decrease its value and cause the foreclosing bank to accept a lower price when it is resold. Foreclosure stripping has been a growing trend since the 2000s decade and especially became an issue during the subprime mortgage crisis of 2007–2010.

Problems with foreclosure stripping
A large societal problem associated with foreclosure stripping is devaluation of property in the local area.  Because homes are being sold as incomplete, the prices are much lower than others in the area, which brings down the local average property value. Foreclosure stripping is also a problem for banks, as mortgages are unavailable on incomplete properties meaning that for resale to occur, a cash buyer is necessary.

Penalties of foreclosure stripping
Foreclosure stripping is considered a crime in most states.  It goes against the terms of the foreclosure deed signed by the home owner, although some would argue that the home remains with the owner until the date at which it is officially signed over to the bank.

In the past, banks have just recovered the cost of the damage from their insurance brokers, and the perpetrators have never been prosecuted.  But recent cases have seen thieves convicted of burglary, a class 4 felony.  States such as Arizona have their own FBI task force to investigate and arrest those guilty of property stripping.

Items that legally must remain with the foreclosed home
Any item that is a built-in feature of the home must remain intact.  This includes:

 Built in appliances such as stovetops and dishwashers
 Cabinets, shelving and countertops throughout the property
 Built in air conditioning units and furnaces
 Plumbing and copper pipes
 Electrical wiring and fixtures including outlets, lighting and ceiling fans
 Doors and associated hardware
 Flooring, including tiles, carpets and decking
 Windows and vents
 Sinks, tubs, toilets, showers and associated hardware
 Landscaping and fencing
 Built in pools and spas

References

Real estate in the United States
Stripping